Manuel Infante (July 29, 1883 – April 21, 1958) was a Spanish composer long resident in France.

A native of Osuna, Infante studied piano and composition with Enrique Morera, and settled in Paris in 1909.  While there, he presented numerous concerts of Spanish music; a Spanish nationalist element is predominant in his own works.  His most significant music was written for piano, and included 2 suites for two pianos. His works became popular through performances by his countryman José Iturbi, to whom many of them are dedicated.

Infante died in Paris on April 21, 1958.

References
David Ewen, Encyclopedia of Concert Music. New York; Hill and Wang, 1959.

External links
 

1883 births
1958 deaths
Spanish classical composers
Spanish male classical composers
Spanish classical pianists
Male classical pianists
20th-century classical composers
Spanish emigrants to France
20th-century Spanish musicians
20th-century classical pianists
20th-century Spanish male musicians